Arafat may refer to:

People
 Yasser Arafat (1929–2004), Chairman of the Palestine Liberation Organization (PLO), President of the Palestinian National Authority (PNA)
 Fathi Arafat (1933–2004), Palestinian physician
 Moussa Arafat (c. 1940–2005), cousin of Yasser Arafat
 Raed Arafat (born 1964), Romanian physician
 Suha Arafat (born 1963), widow of Yasser Arafat
 Yasir Arafat (disambiguation), several people
 DJ Arafat (1986–2019), an Ivorian DJ and singer who made music in the Coupé-Décalé genre

Places
 Yasser Arafat International Airport
 Arafat, Makkah, a plain about 20 km Southeast of Mecca
 Mount Arafat, visited as part of the Hajj
 Arafat, Iran, a village in West Azerbaijan Province, Iran
 Arafat, Mauritania
 Arafat, Çınar

Other uses
 Arafat (journal), a 1946–47 Pakistani periodical covering Islamic law
 Day of Arafa